Tuipui is a village in the Champhai district of Mizoram, India. It is located in the Khawzawl R.D. Block.

Demographics 

According to the 2011 census of India, Tuipui has 95 households. The effective literacy rate (i.e. the literacy rate of population excluding children aged 6 and below) is 100%.

References 

Villages in Khawzawl block